George Damer (1727–1752), of Winterborne Came, Dorset, was an English politician.

He was a Member (MP) of the Parliament of Great Britain for Dorchester 1751 to 1752.

References

1727 births
1752 deaths
Members of the Parliament of Great Britain for English constituencies
Politicians from Dorset
British MPs 1747–1754